Tzigane is a composition by Maurice Ravel.

Tzigane may also refer to:

 Tzigane (novel), a 1935 novel by Eleanor Smith
 Tzigane (TV series), a 1954 Canadian television series
 Tzigane (ballet), a ballet by George Balanchine
 Eugene Tzigane, American conductor
 Tzigane, an alternative name for Romani people
 Tzigane music, an alternative name for Romani music